Joseph Jackson (September 23, 1880 – December 30, 1960) was an American sport shooter and Olympic champion. He was born in St. Louis, Missouri. He won three gold medals, all in team events, at the 1920 Summer Olympics in Antwerp.

References

External links
Joseph Jackson at FindAGrave

1880 births
1960 deaths
American male sport shooters
Shooters at the 1920 Summer Olympics
Olympic gold medalists for the United States in shooting
Olympic medalists in shooting
United States Distinguished Marksman
Sportspeople from St. Louis
Medalists at the 1920 Summer Olympics
19th-century American people
20th-century American people